Sadala Point (‘Nos Sadala’ \'nos sa-'da-la\) is a point on the southeast coast of Robert Island in the South Shetland Islands, Antarctica projecting 500 m into Bransfield Strait.  Situated 2.43 km northeast of the southeast extremity of Robert Point, 2.97 km south-southwest of Batuliya Point and 4.8 km south-southwest of Kitchen Point.

The point is named after King Sadala of Thrace, 87-79 B.C.

Location
Bulgarian mapping in 2009 and 2010.

Maps
 L.L. Ivanov. Antarctica: Livingston Island and Greenwich, Robert, Snow and Smith Islands. Scale 1:120000 topographic map.  Troyan: Manfred Wörner Foundation, 2009.

References
 Sadala Point. SCAR Composite Gazetteer of Antarctica.
 Bulgarian Antarctic Gazetteer. Antarctic Place-names Commission. (details in Bulgarian, basic data in English)

External links
 Sadala Point. Copernix satellite image

Headlands of Robert Island
Bulgaria and the Antarctic